The Last Albatross is the first book in Ian Irvine's Eco-thriller titles, set in 2010. It depicts what our world might be like in a few years time, focusing on environmental depletion and cultural degeneration.  There is a large emphasis on green cults and terrorists, as well as a love story. The ePub version of the eBook is available to download for free on Ian Irvine's website. It is also available on the Amazon Kindle, but is not free.

Characters 
Jemma Elizabeth Hardey: is wife to Ryn Hardey. After finding out that Ryn and Hercus Barges stole plutonium from Maralinga, she enters her name into the Death Lottery and is haunted by emails encouraging her to commit suicide, like thousands of others around the world. She returns home to Ryn where they are chased and tracked. Jemma is a timid character who grows with confidence throughout the novel.
Ryn Hardey: is the husband of Jemma Hardey. He steals some plutonium from Maralinga with Hercus Barges, a dominant friend from university. Years later he and his wife are threatened by desperate green cults, determined to get their hands on the explosive material.
Hercus Barges:
Levi Seth:
Ulf Bamert:

Reception 
Jackie Cassada said in her review for Library Journal that "the author of The View from the Mirror crafts a chilling sf suspense story set against a backdrop of 21st-century environmental depletion and cultural degeneration. First published in Australia, Irvine's latest novel, the first in a trilogy of eco-thrillers, portrays a frighteningly plausible near future".

Titles of the Human Rites Sequence 
 The Last Albatross (November 2000)
 Terminator Gene (April 2003)
 The Life Lottery (August 2004)

Notes

Publishers 
 Simon & Schuster Australia
 Mobipocket

Novels by Ian Irvine
2000 novels
2000 science fiction novels
Australian science fiction novels
Fiction set in 2010